Discovery+ is a streaming service owned and operated by Warner Bros. Discovery, which features a catalog of programming from Warner Bros. Discovery's factual networks. The service also streams programming from the BBC and A&E Networks. It was first launched in India on March 23, 2020.

Original programming

Documentary

Drama

Reality

Indian originals

Upcoming programming

Drama

References 

Discovery+
Discovery+